Disca hackeri is a moth of the family Erebidae first described by Michael Fibiger in 2007. It is known from Borneo.

The wingspan is about 11 mm. The forewing is beige brown. The hindwing is grey and the underside unicolorous brown.

References

Micronoctuini
Taxa named by Michael Fibiger
Moths described in 2007
Moths of Borneo